George Fisher may refer to:

Arts and entertainment
George Fisher (actor) (1891–1960), American actor
George Fisher (dramatist) (1909–1970), Welsh language author
George Fisher (journalist) (1909–1987), Hollywood gossip columnist and radio personality
George Fisher (cartoonist) (1923–2003), American political cartoonist
George Fisher (1927–2005), American actor a.k.a. Brock Peters
George Fisher (musician) (born 1970), American singer

Politics
George Fisher (Illinois pioneer) (died 1820), American pioneer, physician, and legislator
George Fisher (New York politician) (1788–1861), American politician
George P. Fisher (1817–1899), American politician in Delaware
George Fisher (New Zealand politician) (1843–1905), New Zealand politician

Science and academics
Rev George Fisher (scientist) (1794–1873), British Arctic scientist
George Jackson Fisher (1825–1893), American physician, bibliophile, collector and author
George Park Fisher (1827–1909), American theologian and historian
George Clyde Fisher (1878–1949), curator at the American Museum of Natural History

Sports
George Fisher (baseball) (1855–1937), American baseball player 
George E. Fisher (1869–1958), American football coach and college professor
George J. Fisher (1871–1960), American physician and sport administrator
Showboat Fisher (George Fisher, 1899–1994), American baseball player
George Fisher (basketball coach) (1924–2014), American college basketball coach and administrator
George Fisher (basketball player)
George Fisher (footballer) (1925–2015), English footballer
George Fisher (netball) (born 1998), English netball player

Other people
George Fisher (settler) (1795–1873), Serbian born Mexican and American citizen
George Fisher (bishop) (1844–1921), Bishop of Southampton in the Church of England
George M. C. Fisher (born 1940), American business manager
George A. Fisher Jr. (born 1942), retired United States Army officer
George Fisher (miner) (1903–2007), chairman of Mount Isa Mines, Australia

See also
George Drennen Fischer, American activist and spokesman for the National Education Association
George R. Fischer (1937–2016), American underwater archaeologist
Georg Fischer (disambiguation)